The Alexander ALX500 (later known as the TransBus ALX500) was a low-floor double-decker bus body built by Alexander in Falkirk, Scotland between 1997 and 2002.

The ALX500 was fitted to Dennis Trident 3 and Volvo Super Olympian chassis (they could be distinguished by the design of the engine compartment: with round indicators for Dennis and square indicators for Volvo), and came in lengths of 10.6, 11.3 and 12 meters (35, 37 and 40 foot). The ALX500-bodied buses were sold new to Citybus, Kowloon Motor Bus, Long Win Bus, New World First Bus and Kowloon-Canton Railway Corporation in Hong Kong. Due to the climate there, all of them were fitted with air conditioning systems, and as a result lacked a rear window on the lower deck. The extra length of the buses meant the seating capacities were near the 100 mark for the 12.0 metre variant.

Alexander built three prototype ALX500 bodies for prototype Trident 3 chassis in 1997, with the first finished in February 1997. Production of the ALX500 body was started later in the same year, with two examples exhibited in Coach & Bus '97 in Birmingham; but there were some minor changes in appearance, for example the exit door was moved rearward (for 12.0m variant only). In 1999, a facelifted version of the ALX500, which more resembled the ALX400 in appearance was introduced, the first of these bodies were fitted to the first batch of Super Olympians for Kowloon Motor Bus and New World First Bus.

When TransBus International was formed in 2001, the ALX500 body replaced the standard height, right hand drive version of the Duple Metsec DM5000 body (built for the Dennis Trident 3) which was duplicated with the ALX500 design. In late 2002, the ALX500 body was superseded by the TransBus Enviro500.

All Alexander ALX500s are retired in March 2023.

References

External links

Alexander Dennis buses
Double-decker buses
Low-floor buses
Tri-axle buses
Vehicles introduced in 1997